Rachel House may refer to
Rachel House (actress) (born 1971), New Zealand actress
 Rachel House, a Scottish children's hospital